Model Village may refer to either of two places in County Cork, Ireland:
 Tower, County Cork (called "Model Village" on Ordnance Survey maps)
 Model Village, Dripsey